Abrar Ahmed (born 11 August 1950) is an Indian politician representing the Samajwadi Party, being a member of the Uttar Pradesh Legislative Assembly from Isauli Assembly constituency.

See also
Seventeenth Legislative Assembly of Uttar Pradesh

References 

1950 births
Living people
Samajwadi Party politicians from Uttar Pradesh
Members of the Uttar Pradesh Legislative Assembly